Japanese football in 1958.

Emperor's Cup

National team

Results

Players statistics

Births
February 4 - Kazuaki Nagasawa
February 11 - Hiroshi Yoshida
February 16 - Nobutoshi Kaneda
March 29 - Tsutomu Sonobe
April 4 - Masakuni Yamamoto
April 5 - Ryoichi Kawakatsu
July 19 - Kazushi Kimura
August 8 - Akihiro Nishimura
September 4 - Satoshi Tezuka
October 19 - Hiromi Hara
December 22 - Masaaki Kato

External links

 
Seasons in Japanese football